Fun Little Movies (FLM) is a production and distribution company of short films intended for the internet and mobile devices. 

It was founded in 1988 by Frank Chindamo, currently an adjunct professor at the University of Southern California. Based in Burbank, California,  Fun Little Movies was the first U.S. company to produce comedic films for mobile phones worldwide.  By the time the company was in development of Psyche 101 in 2004, they had already begun producing shorts promoting internet dating services.  In 2007, ROK Entertainment bought controlling interest in FLM, although in 2008 ROK defaulted on their agreement.

Founder
Frank Chindamo is a film producer, director, screenwriter, educator, and the President and Chief Creative Officer of Fun Little Movies.  He received a Film Bachelor of Fine Arts from New York University  and a Screenwriting Master of Fine Arts from Columbia University, and is an  adjunct professor at the University of Southern California, where he teaches "Mobile/Internet Viral Screenwriting and Production", and an instructor at UCLA where he teaches "Beyond YouTube: Making Mobile and Internet Movies that Sell".  He has taught at the Gotham Writer’s Workshop and City University of New York, is a former Executive Director of the Staged Screenplay Reading Series at the Lee Strasberg Theatre and Film Institute, and former Director of the Professional Screenwriting Workshops at Sony Studios.  In 1988 Chindamo founded Fun Little Movies was founded as a short-film company to develop interstitial programming for Showtime, Comedy Central, PBS, CBS, and Playboy TV.  As early as 1991, Frank Chindamo was creating and screening "Funny Short Movies", and in 1994 submitting his "Funny Little Movies" to film festivals such as the Deauville Film Festival in Paris.  In 2003, he was vice president of development at The Pritcher Company in Beverly Hills, California, involved in production of both features and TV shows.

In 2006 and 2007, Chindamo, was named one of the Top 40 people in IPTV, and in 2008 he was nominated Entrepreneur of the Year by Ernst & Young.

History 
Fun Little Movies was founded as a short-film company in 1988 by Frank Chindamo and developed interstitial programming for such networks as ShowTime, Comedy Central, PBS, CBS, and Playboy TV.

In 2004, Fun Little Movies became the first U.S. company to produce comedic films for mobile phones worldwide when Mobile Media Labs announced they were to begin distribution of made-for-mobile and made-for-Internet "HowTo" and "Health" related reference videos over a new movie channel to be launched on FLM.

In 2005 Sprint launched Sprint TV as two new independent mobile-TV content providers for the carrier's premier multimedia service offerings by Fun Little Movies.  In June 2005, Smartvideo added FLM and E! Entertainment to its mobile video channel line-up.  And in December 2005, FLM concluded a deal with the ZVUE family of portable media players to make over 1,000 short films available for download to ZVUE owners.

At the 2006 NATPE convention Fun Little Movies co-sponsored the first annual MoTV Awards and presented the "Fun Little Movies Award for Best Comedy".  The winner was Miami 85 by Santa Fe Community College professor Marc Shahboz, which was said by FLM President Frank Chindamo to be "the coolest, most visually-exciting piece we saw".

In 2007 HandHeld Entertainment expanded an existing agreement with Fun Little Movies in order to stream FLM's short comedy videos on their network of Web sites, including ZVUE.com, Putfile.com, YourDailyMedia.com, UnOriginal.co.uk, FunMansion.com and Dorks.com.

In 2008, ROK Entertainment, a United Kingdom-based mobile TV provider, bought a majority (51 percent) stake of Fun Little Movies for a total of $1.375 million.  
Also in 2008 FLM debuted the Toyota series The Pool, a humorous series about a group of carpoolers, who happen to drive a Toyota Camry.

Recognition 
Fun Little Movies has won more than 20 awards, including a finalist's place for Best Live Action Short Film at the Cannes Film Festival.  These include the 2006 and 2007 Mobile Entertainment Magazine Awards for Best Video, top prize at the 2003 CTIA's "World Smallest Film Festival", and two Golden Eagles at the American Cine Awards.

At the MoFilm competition at the February 2009 GSMA Mobile World Congress held in Barcelona, Spain, out of 250 entries from more than 100 countries, Fun Little Movies's production Turbo Dates: English as a Second Language won both Best Comedy and the Grand Prix.

Further reading 
 Mashable Are You Up for a Half-Hour TV Show About Mobile Apps?
Chicago Tribune, "Still in its infancy, cell phone cinema preps for a close-up"
USA Today, "When the movie theater fits in your hand"
Reuters, "Spacey and Will.i.am back mobile content"
Los Angeles Times, "'I Can't Talk, I'm Watching My Cellphone'"
Los Angeles Times, "'THE WEB, ETC.; WEB SCOUT; Web-only series? Yep. Audience? '"
Los Angeles Times, "'Television; CRITIC'S NOTEBOOK; Airing soon on a gas pump near you; TV, mutating and decentralized, can be whatever and wherever we want it to be. '"
Los Angeles Times, "'New media will get Emmy of their own; Daytime awards adds a category for podcasts, video blogs, even original content created for cellphones. '"
Nuovu (French), "Hollywood s'empare du mobile (Hollywood takes mobile)"

References

External links 
Fun Little Movies Official website
Frank Chindamo at the Internet Movie Database
CNN video: Mobile film festival launches
Voice of the Entenpreneur, video: Frank Chindamo
http://www.columbia.edu/cu/news/clips/2005/05/24/ComingSoonFORBES.pdf
--
 https://pqasb.pqarchiver.com/latimes/access/834305031.html?FMT=ABS&FMTS=ABS:FT&type=current&date=May+7%2C+2005&author=Matea+Gold&pub=Los+Angeles+Times&edition=&startpage=A.18&desc=The+Nation%3B+%27I+Can%27t+Talk%2C+I%27m+Watching+My+Cellphone%27%3B+TV+programs+head+to+an+even+smaller+screen+as+carriers+scramble+for+mobile+clips+to+air.

--

Companies based in Los Angeles
Mass media companies established in 1988
Film production companies of the United States